Petit-Lac-Sainte-Anne is an unorganized territory in the Canadian province of Quebec, located in the Kamouraska Regional County Municipality.

See also
 List of unorganized territories in Quebec

References

Incorporated places in Bas-Saint-Laurent